Capasso is an Italian surname. Notable people with the surname include:

Carl Andrew Capasso (1945–2001)
Federico Capasso (born 1949), American physicist
Manuel Vicente Capasso (born 1996), Argentine professional footballer 
Michael Capasso (born 1960), American opera director

Italian-language surnames